Mount Heron is an unincorporated community in Buchanan County, Virginia, in the United States.

History
A post office was established as Mount Heron in 1925, and remained in operation until it was discontinued in 1965. According to one source, the community may be named after Heron, Montana.

References

Unincorporated communities in Buchanan County, Virginia
Unincorporated communities in Virginia